The LBSCR I2 class was a class of 4-4-2 steam tank locomotives designed by D. E. Marsh for suburban passenger service on the London, Brighton and South Coast Railway.  The I4 class were of the same design but incorporated a superheated boiler.

I2 Class

In 1907, following the failure of his I1 class, Douglas Earle Marsh sought to remedy some of the faults with a new design of 4-4-2T with a longer wheelbase, larger boiler and detailed changes to the front end. In the original order, five of the locomotives would incorporate a superheated boiler, to be supplied by the North British Locomotive Company, and the remainder traditional saturated steam boilers from Brighton Works. In the event, the superheated boilers were delayed in construction and so all ten I2 locomotives had traditional boilers.

I4 Class

When the superheated boilers eventually arrived they were used for five further locomotives of the same design as the I2, but these were classified as I4.

Unfortunately neither the I2 nor I4 class addressed the fundamental problems with the I1 class, which was a firebox that was far too small. As a result, the two classes had relatively short lives working lightly loaded secondary services, and the Stroudley D1 class, and Billinton E4 class, which they had been designed to replace, continued working.

Numbering

LB&SCR numbers were 11-20 and 31-35.  The Southern Railway, which acquired the locomotives in 1923, initially numbered them B11-B20, B31-35 and later 2011-2020, 2031-2035.

Withdrawal

All the I2 were withdrawn between 1933 and 1939 but two locomotives, numbers 2013 and 2019, saw further service on the Longmoor Military Railway where they survived until at least 1947.  At Longmoor, they were numbered 2400 and 2401 respectively.  These numbers were later changed to 72400 and 72401. The I4 class were withdrawn between 1936 and 1940. No examples of either class have been preserved.

Locomotive Summary

Sources

External links
 Marsh I2 Class 4-4-2T at semgonline.com

I2
4-4-2T locomotives
War Department locomotives
Railway locomotives introduced in 1907
Scrapped locomotives